Comet Gehrels 4 (or P/1997 C1) is a Periodic comet.

References 

Periodic comets